Ellingsrudåsen is a subway station on the Oslo Metro, located at Ellingsrud in the Alna borough. Since its opening on 8 November 1981, it has been the end station for the Furuset Line (Line 2). Ellingsrudåsen is a mostly residential area. Above the station is a small shopping centre.

Ellingsrudåsen is located deep underground, and elevators are the usual means of getting to and from the station. Like Romsås, Ellingsrudåsen has natural mountain walls.

References

External links

Oslo Metro stations in Oslo
Railway stations opened in 1981
1981 establishments in Norway